New York's 87th State Assembly district is one of the 150 districts in the New York State Assembly. It has been represented by Democrat Karines Reyes since 2019.

Geography
District 87 is located in The Bronx, comprising portions of Parkchester, West Farms and Castle Hill. A portion of Bronx Park, containing the Bronx Zoo, is within this district.

Recent election results

2022

2020

2018

2016

2014

2012

References

87